The Ultimate Clip Collection is a 2003 DVD compilation of seven music videos American rock band The Hooters made for Columbia Records.

DVD features

Technical side
Available Audio Tracks:
English (Dolby Digital 5.1)
English (PCM Stereo)

Content
Music videos:
 "500 Miles" (Hedy West, additional lyrics by Rob Hyman, Eric Bazilian, Rick Chertoff)
 "Johnny B." (Rob Hyman, Eric Bazilian, Rick Chertoff)
 "Satellite" (Rob Hyman, Eric Bazilian, Rick Chertoff)
 "And We Danced" (Rob Hyman, Eric Bazilian)
 "Karla With a K" (The Hooters)
 "Brother, Don't You Walk Away" (Rob Hyman, Eric Bazilian, Rick Chertoff)
 "Where Do the Children Go" (Rob Hyman, Eric Bazilian)

Awards

At Billboard'''s 8th Annual Video Music Conference on November 22, 1986, The Hooters received an award for Best Concert Performance'' for the "Where Do the Children Go" video.

Personnel
Eric Bazilian: lead vocals, guitar, mandolin
Rob Hyman: lead vocals, keyboards, accordion
David Uosikkinen: drums
John Lilley: guitar
Andy King: bass guitar, vocals
Fran Smith Jr.: bass guitar, vocals (tracks 1,6)

Additional musicians
Peter, Paul and Mary: background vocals on "500 Miles"

2003 films